Craig Marais (born 10 November 1965) is a South African cricketer. He played in 22 first-class and 12 List A matches from 1990/91 to 1994/95.

References

External links
 

1965 births
Living people
South African cricketers
Boland cricketers
Griqualand West cricketers
Cricketers from Cape Town